Open access scholarly communication of Poland can be searched via the "CeON Aggregator" of the University of Warsaw Interdisciplinary Centre for Mathematical and Computational Modelling's Centre for Open Science.

Repositories 
As of March 2018, the UK-based Directory of Open Access Repositories lists some 91 repositories in Poland. However, according to the OpenAIRE project, "the majority of these are digital libraries, providing access to the digitized content of library collections, not functioning as repositories open to authors for the deposition of their own work." University of Lodz Repository and Adam Mickiewicz University Repository maintain the largest number of digital assets. The Warsaw Public Library runs the  digital library, established in 2011.

See also

 Koalicja Otwartej Edukacji (Open Education Coalition), est. 2008
 Internet in Poland
 Education in Poland
 Media of Poland
 Copyright law of Poland
 Open access in other countries

References

Further reading
in English
 
 
 
  

in Polish

External links
  (Centre for Open Science)
 
 
 
 
 
 Poland: Open access: External links (in Polish)

Academia in Poland
Communications in Poland
Poland
Publishing in Poland
Science and technology in Poland